Stamford High School may refer to:
Stamford High School (Stamford, Connecticut)
Stamford High School (Texas)
Stamford High School, Lincolnshire